Holly Marsh is a small saltwater marshland in Mashpee, Massachusetts on the shores of Popponesset Bay, Cape Cod.

The marsh starts at Daniel's Island (actually a peninsula) and extends down both the mainland side and the Popponesset Island side of the Popponesset Creek.

Other uses
Mount Holly Marsh Preserve is a wetland near Mount Holly Springs, Pennsylvania.  It is part of the Mount Holly Preserve and is maintained by the Nature Conservancy.

References 

Landforms of Barnstable County, Massachusetts
Marshes of Massachusetts
Mashpee, Massachusetts
Protected areas of Barnstable County, Massachusetts